Invictus Infinitum is the second album by Australian melodic death metal band Switchblade. It was recorded and engineered by ex Cryogenic drummer Darren Jenkins at LA Studios, Sydney, mixed by Grammy Award-winning producer and engineer Neil Kernon in Chicago, USA, and mastered by Alan Douches in New Windsor, USA.

Invictus Infinitum was released in Australia and New Zealand on 6 June 2009 by AmpHead Music, and digitally released worldwide by New York-based digital distribution label The Orchard.

The album features a special guest guitar solo by Nevermore lead guitarist, Jeff Loomis on the track "Reflective Curse".

Track listing

Personnel
 Adam Helmrich – vocals
 Andrew Najdek – guitar
 Anthony Delvecchio – guitar
 Mat Piccolotto – drums
 Gerard Dack – bass guitar
Sheri Tantawy – artwork, photography and design

Notes 

2009 albums
Switchblade (band) albums